Pro-Specs is a South Korean athletic shoe and sportswear manufacturer, which currently produces footwear and clothing for running. Its headquarters are located in Seoul. It is one of brands in 'LS Networks'.

History 
Founded by Al Spector from Boston, MA. The Pro-Specs was reestablished in 1981 to produce shoes and sportswear for general use. Currently LS Group's subdiary LS Networks owns the brand.

Brand history 
 1981–2007: PRO-SPECS
 2008–2019: PROSPECS
 2020–present: PRO-SPECS

Sponsorships

Competition
 1997 Korean League Cup

Baseball

Current Club teams
2022– : LG Twins

Former Club teams
 1982–2001: Kia Tigers
 1983, 1993–2000: Lotte Giants
 1983–1984: MBC Chungyong
 1985: Chungbo Pintos
 1994–1996, 1998–1999: Ssangbangwool Raiders
 2000: SK Wyverns
 2002–2004: Hanwha Eagles

Basketball

Current Club teams
2021– : Changwon LG Sakers

Former Club teams
 1997–2000: Wonju Dongbu Promy
 2002–2005: Ulsan Mobis Phoebus
 2005–2008: Incheon ET Land Elephants
 2008–2011: Changwon LG Sakers

Boxing
 Oh Kwang-soo (Former)
 Choi Hi-yong (Former)
 Cho In-joo (Former)
 Choi Yong-soo (Former)

Football

Current Club teams
2021– : FC Seoul

Former Club teams
 October 1987 – 1989, 1993–1995: Pohang Steelers
 1994–1996: Ulsan Hyundai FC
 2000–2009: Seongnam FC

Volleyball

Current Club teams
 2019–present: GS Caltex Seoul KIXX

Former Club teams
 1983–2006: Cheonan Hyundai Capital Skywalkers
 2006–2009: Incheon Korean Air Jumbos
 2008–2010: Gumi LIG Insurance Greaters

References

External links
Official Site

Sportswear brands
South Korean brands
Manufacturing companies based in Seoul
Clothing companies established in 1981
Sporting goods brands
Sporting goods manufacturers of South Korea